Peter Ronson (April 22, 1934 – January 16, 2007), born Pétur Rögnvaldsson, was an Icelandic-born athlete and actor.

He competed in the 110 metres hurdles at the 1960 Summer Olympics. As an actor, he played Hans Bjelke and was credited as a technical adviser in the 1959 film adaptation of Journey to the Center of the Earth.

He died of natural causes in 2007 in Orange County, California. He is survived by two sons, Brian and Stephen, with his wife Marie, and by three children from a previous relationship, Lisa, Pétur Jr., and Kristine.

Filmography
Journey to the Center of the Earth (1959) - Hans Belker

References

External links

1934 births
2007 deaths
Peter Ronson
Athletes (track and field) at the 1960 Summer Olympics
Peter Ronson
Peter Ronson